Gymnopilus marasmioides is a species of mushroom in the family Hymenogastraceae.

See also

List of Gymnopilus species

External links
Gymnopilus marasmioides at Index Fungorum

marasmioides
Fungi of North America